Equity may refer to:

Finance, accounting and ownership
Equity (finance), ownership of assets that have liabilities attached to them
 Stock, equity based on original contributions of cash or other value to a business
 Home equity, the difference between the market value and unpaid mortgage balance on a home
 Private equity, stock in a privately held company
 The equity method of accounting for large investment interests

Business, justice and law
 Equity (law), in common law jurisdictions
 Equity (economics), the study of fairness in economics
 Educational equity, the study and achievement of population-proportionate group inclusion and credentialing in education
 Intergenerational equity, equality and fairness in relationships between people in different generations (including those yet to be born)
 Equity theory, on the relations and perceptions of fairness in distributions of resources within social and professional situations.
 Employment equity (Canada), policy requiring or encouraging the hiring of disenfranchised minorities
 Health equity, fairness and justice in health and healthcare

Education and social sciences 
 Social equity

Companies and organizations
The word equity is also used in the names of the following companies and organizations:

Companies
 Equity Industries, an electronics subsidiary of Chiaphua Components Group
 Equity Music Group, a  defunct American country music record label, founded by Clint Black
 EQ Office, one of the largest owners and managers of office buildings in the United States

Organizations
 Actors' Equity Association, United States labor union of actors and stage managers 
 American Society of Equity, United States agrarian reform organization
 Canadian Actors' Equity Association, an association in Canada
 Equity (British trade union) (formerly British Actors' Equity Association), an association in the United Kingdom
 Forum Party of Alberta, a defunct political party from Alberta, Canada also known as the Equity Party
 Transportation Equity Network, American organization advocating equity-based transportation policies

Other
 Equity, Ohio, a community in the United States
 In poker strategy, a player's expected share of the pot 
 Brand equity, in marketing, the value built up in a brand
 Equity (film), a 2016 American film directed by Meera Menon
 Equity (typeface), also known as Ehrhardt, a font designed by Matthew Butterick

See also
 Equity Bank (disambiguation)
 Equality (disambiguation)
 Inequality (disambiguation)